Shia Islam in Afghanistan is practiced by a significant minority of the population. According to a PEW 2021 survey, 7% of Afghans followed Shia Islam, but other estimates have put the number as high as 35%. Afghanistan's Shia are primarily the Twelvers, while a minority are Ismailis.

Twelvers
The majority of Afghanistan's Shia Muslim's are the Twelvers, primarily of the Hazara ethnicity. The next-largest Twelvers are the Farsiwan of the western Herat and Farah provinces. Other, far smaller, Afghanistan's Twelver communities include the Qizilbash and the Sadat populations.

Ismailis
A smaller portion of Afghanistan's Shia are Nizari Ismailis; these populations include many of the Pamir language speakers of the northeastern portion of the country (predominantly in Badakhshan Province bordering Tajikistan).

Baghlan Province is also home to an Ismaili community, the Sayeds of Kayan. Their leader is Sayed Mansur Naderi and his son, Sayed Jaffar Naderi. During the Soviet–Afghan War, about 10,000 Ismaili militiamen defended the Baghlan Ismaili stronghold of Kayan. They struck a deal with the Soviets in not attacking them, but logistically supported the Mujahideen. In 2003 it was reported that unlike other Ismaili communities in the region and worldwide, the Baghlan Ismailis did not defer to the spiritual leader of Ismailis worldwide, the Aga Khan.

See also
Islam in Afghanistan
Religion in Afghanistan
Islamic conquest of Afghanistan

References

External links

Afghan Shia News Agency